Trilateral is something having three sides or perspectives and may refer to:

The Trilateral Ankara cooperation process, a process in Pakistani–Turkish or Afghan–Turkish relations
Trilateral Commission, a private organization, established to foster closer cooperation among the United States, Europe and Japan.
Trilateral Patent Offices, the European Patent Office (EPO), the Japan Patent Office (JPO) and the United States Patent and Trademark Office (USPTO). 
Trilateral Progression, the fourth album by Neuraxis.
Trilateral symmetry, a three-fold form of rotational symmetry.
Retinoblastoma is said to be trilateral if it occurs in both eyes and also in the pineal gland.
North American Leaders' Summit, or Trilateral Summit, between Canada, Mexico, and the United States
 Trilateral (album)

See also
Trilateration, a method for determining the intersections of three sphere surfaces given the centers and radii of the three spheres.
Egyptian triliteral signs are symbols which represent a specific sequence of three consonants, also vowels and consonants, in the language.